Edward Stephenson (born c. 1852 in West Bromwich) was an English football secretary-manager, who performed that role at West Bromwich Albion from November 1894 to January 1895. He was dismissed from the post for incompetence.

References

External links

 

Sportspeople from West Bromwich
English football managers
West Bromwich Albion F.C. managers
Year of birth unknown
Year of death unknown